The 1955 Cork Senior Hurling Championship was the 67th staging of the Cork Senior Hurling Championship since its establishment by the Cork County Board in 1887. The championship began on 27 March 1955 and ended on 16 October 1955.

Glen Rovers entered the championship as the defending champions.

On 16 October 1955, St. Finbarr's won the championship following a 7-8 to 2-6 defeat of Glen Rovers in a replay of the final. This was their 15th championship title overall and their first title in eight championship seasons.

Results

First round

Second round

Quarter-finals

Semi-finals

Finals

Championship statistics

Miscellaneous

 St. Finbarr's win the title for the first time since 1947.
 In the first round replay there was confusion when the Sarsfields team lined out in an all blue strip which was almost identical to the St. Finbarr's strip. St. Finbarr's lined out in green jerseys but objected to playing against what they termed "their own colours". They eventually elected to do so but only "under protest".

References

Cork Senior Hurling Championship
Cork Senior Hurling Championship